Encephalartos princeps is a species of cycad that is native to Eastern Cape Province of South Africa.

Descriptions
It is an arborescent species, with a stem up to 6 m tall, erect, sometimes decumbent or even hanging, of 40–60 cm of diameter. 

The leaves, pinnate, arranged in a crown at the apex of the stem, are 100–130 cm long, silvery-green to bluish-green in color, with a 15–26 cm long petiole. They are formed by numerous lanceolate, opposite, 15–19 cm long and 13–20 mm wide leaves, with a leathery consistency, inserted on the rachis with an angle of 45°.

It is a dioecious species; the male specimens usually have 1 to 3 cones, sub-cylindrical, olive-green, 16–26 cm long and 8–10 cm in diameter; female ones have 1 to 3 cones, ovoid, 30–40 cm long, 20–25 cm in diameter.

The seeds are ovoid, 24–26 mm long, covered with a red sarcotesta.

References

External links
 
 

princeps
Endemic flora of South Africa
Flora of the Cape Provinces
Vulnerable flora of Africa
Plants described in 2010